Golyshmanovo is the name of several inhabited localities in Golyshmanovsky District of Tyumen Oblast, Russia.

Urban localities
Golyshmanovo (urban locality), a work settlement in Golyshmanovo Rural Okrug

Rural localities
Golyshmanovo (rural locality), a selo in Golyshmanovsky Rural Okrug